Talkhapur is a town in Sitamarhi district in Bihar, India. The population of the town is 15,961. The sex ratio is 53% male and 47% female. The literacy rate is 57% in males and 39% in females.

Cities and towns in Sitamarhi district